Conus aureopunctatus is a species of sea snail, a marine gastropod mollusk in the family Conidae, the cone snails, cone shells or cones.

These snails are predatory and venomous. They are capable of "stinging" humans.

Description
Original description: "Shell small for genus, turnip-shaped, with wide body whorl and prominent constriction around anterior one-third, producing distinct anterior canal; shell shiny, polished; shoulder sharply carinated, with bladelike carina; spire elevated, scalariform; anterior third of shell ornamented with 10 thick, raised, spiral cords, each separated from others by deeply-incised sulci; base color of shell white; smooth portion of body whorl with 4 rows of pale yellow-orange dots; spiral cords on anterior end marked with yellow-orange dots; spire whorls smooth, with numerous crescent-shaped orange flammules; interior of aperture white; periostracum brown, thick, and smooth."

The size of the shell attains 20 mm.

Distribution
Locus typicus: Erroneously stated as "Gulf of Venezuela, 
off Punto Fijo, Falcon state, Venezuela"- but now corrected to Cabo Gracias a Dios
on the Honduran-Nicaraguan border

This marine species of cone snail occurs in the Caribbean Sea 
off Nicaragua and Venezuela

References

 Tucker J.K. & Tenorio M.J. (2013) Illustrated catalog of the living cone shells. 517 pp. Wellington, Florida: MdM Publishing.
 Puillandre N., Duda T.F., Meyer C., Olivera B.M. & Bouchet P. (2015). One, four or 100 genera? A new classification of the cone snails. Journal of Molluscan Studies. 81: 1-23

External links
 To World Register of Marine Species
 

aureopunctatus
Gastropods described in 1987